
This is a list of the 27 players who earned their 2015 European Tour card through Q School in 2014.

 2015 European Tour rookie

2015 Results

* European Tour rookie in 2015
T = Tied 
 The player retained his European Tour card for 2016 (finished inside the top 110).
 The player did not retain his European Tour card for 2016, but retained conditional status (finished between 111–149).
 The player did not retain his European Tour card for 2016 (finished outside the top 149).

Scrivener, Otaegui, McEvoy, and Jensen regained their cards for 2016 through Q School, while Virto graduated from the Challenge Tour in 2015.

Winners on the European Tour in 2015

Runners-up on the European Tour in 2015

See also
2014 Challenge Tour graduates
2015 European Tour

References

External links
Official website

European Tour
European Tour Qualifying School Graduates
European Tour Qualifying School Graduates